Smallbone is a surname. Notable people with the surname include:

 Frederick Smallbone (born 1948), British rower
 Joel Smallbone (born 1984), Australian singer and actor
 with his brother Luke (born 1986) in For King & Country
 Rebecca Smallbone (born 1977), became Rebecca St. James
 Will Smallbone (born 2000), English footballer

Other uses
 Smallbone Deceased, a mystery novel by Michael Gilbert
 Smallbone Park, a cricket ground in Rotorua, New Zealand

See also
 Robert Smallbones (1884-1976), British diplomat